Stanley John was an Indian cardiothoracic surgeon, a former professor at the Christian Medical College and Hospital (CMCH) and one of the pioneers of cardiothoracic surgery in India. He is reported to have performed the first surgical repairs of Ebstein's anomaly, Ruptured Sinus of Valsalva (RSOV) and Double Outlet Right Ventricle (DORV) in India. He assisted in performing the first open heart surgery in India while working at CMCH. During his tenure of 25 years at the institution, he mentored several known surgeons such as V.V. Bashi, A. G. K. Gokhale,  J. S. N. Murthy and Ganesh Kumar Mani. Later, John joined Yellamma Dasappa Hospital, Bengaluru at the Department of Thoracic and Cardiovascular Surgery. He is an elected fellow of the National Academy of Medical Sciences, and the Government of India awarded him the fourth highest Indian civilian award of Padma Shri in 1975. He served as the 13th President of the Indian Association of Cardiovascular-Thoracic Surgeons (IACTS) between 1982 and 1983.

See also

 Christian Medical College and Hospital
 Nagarur Gopinath

References

Recipients of the Padma Shri in medicine
Medical doctors from Kerala
Malayali people
Indian cardiac surgeons
Indian medical academics
Living people
Fellows of the National Academy of Medical Sciences
20th-century Indian medical doctors
20th-century surgeons
1932 births